The Pitcairn reed warbler (Acrocephalus vaughani) is a songbird in the genus Acrocephalus. Formerly placed in the "Old World warbler" assemblage (Sylviidae), it is now in the newly recognized marsh-warbler family Acrocephalidae.

It is endemic to Pitcairn Island in the southern Pacific. Locally known as the "sparrow" (true sparrows are not found on Pitcairn), it used to be common throughout the island, where it is the only land bird. It was formerly classified as a vulnerable species by the IUCN due to its small range. But new research has shown it to be rarer than it was believed. Consequently, it was uplisted to endangered status in 2008.

References 

 BirdLife International (BLI) (2008): [2008 IUCN Redlist status changes]. Retrieved 23 May 2008

External links

BirdLife Species Factsheet.

Pitcairn reed warbler
Birds of the Pitcairn Islands
Pitcairn reed warbler